Bordi is a coastal village in the Palghar district of Maharashtra, India. It is located in Dahanu taluka. It is a tourist destination due to its beach and natural environment. It is also famous for the Chickoo fruit and has many Chikoo farms. A festival named Chikoo Festival also takes place in Bordi.

Demographics 

According to the 2011 census of India, Bordi has 1647 households. The effective literacy rate (i.e. the literacy rate of population excluding children aged 6 and below) is 87.71%.

शिक्षण पंढरी (A place where an Education is being Worshiped) 
Bordi is famous for its century old school named "Soonabai Pestonji Hakeemji HighSchool"

Acharya Bhise Guruji, Pujya Chitre Guruji, Atmarampant Sawe Sir, Sane Sir, are some of the veterans who contributed their lives to make Bordi a शिक्षण पंढरी (A place where an Education is being Worshiped) !

Education and Knowledge are being worshiped in this small village abundantly blessed by Mother Nature.

Elsewhere, it is called वसतिगृह (Hostel), but in Bordi, it is called "शारदाश्रम" means सरस्वती माता (Goddess of Wisdom), resides in the आश्रम (student's abode) and Bless them.

You will find proud alumni of 'SPH HighSchool' almost everywhere in the world.

References 

Villages in Dahanu taluka